The 2016 FIFA Futsal World Cup was the eighth FIFA Futsal World Cup, the quadrennial international futsal championship contested by the men's national teams of the member associations of FIFA. The tournament was held in Colombia from 10 September to 1 October 2016.

Brazil and Spain, the two teams that won all seven previous tournaments, were eliminated in the round of 16 and quarter-finals respectively. Their elimination makes this tournament was the first in which the champions was neither of them.

Argentina defeated Russia 5–4 in the final to win the tournament; becoming only the third country to win a FIFA Futsal World Cup title.

Host selection
Two countries bid for the tournament:
 
 
Four countries withdrew their bids:
 
 
 
 

The FIFA Executive Committee announced on 28 May 2013 that Colombia was appointed as host of the tournament.

Qualified teams
A total of 24 teams qualify for the final tournament. In addition to Colombia who qualified automatically as hosts, the other 23 teams qualify from six separate continental competitions. FIFA ratified the distribution of spots at the Executive Committee meeting in March 2014.

1.Teams that made their debut.
2.Kazakhstan's last appearance was when it was a member of the AFC

Venues
Colombia presented the cities of Bogotá, Villavicencio, Bucaramanga, Cúcuta, Ibagué and Neiva as host cities when they bid to host the tournament. After an inspection meeting in October 2014, four stadiums were confirmed, with Neiva allowed an extension to finish works, before being removed as a venue later that month.

Confirmation of the four host cities were presented to the Colombian Football Federation and FIFA on 11 November. Medellín then replaced Villavicencio.
A further inspection in January 2016 saw the removal of Ibagué as a host, meaning half of the cities in the initial bids proposal are confirmed, with the three remaining cites scheduled to accommodate two groups per stadia.

Emblem
The official emblem was unveiled on 29 September 2015.

Mascot
The official mascot, a spectacled bear, was launched on 19 April 2016.

Draw
The official draw was held on 19 May 2016, 18:00 COT (UTC−5), at the Plaza Mayor Conference Centre in Medellín. The teams were seeded based on their performances in previous FIFA Futsal World Cups and confederation tournaments, with the hosts Colombia automatically seeded and assigned to position A1. Moreover, for ticket sales reasons, the hosts and the top two teams (Colombia, Brazil and Spain) were spread across the three venues for the group matches: Cali (Groups A and C), Medellín (Groups B and F) and Bucaramanga (Groups D and E). Teams of the same confederation could not meet in the group stage, except that there were one group with two UEFA teams.

Match officials
The following officials were chosen for the tournament.

Squads

Each team must name a squad of 14 players (two of whom must be goalkeepers) by the FIFA deadline. The official squads were announced by FIFA on 2 September 2016.

Group stage
The match schedule was officially confirmed on 5 February 2016, a week after the removal of Ibagué from the host cities.

The top two teams of each group and the four best third-placed teams advance to the round of 16.

Tiebreakers
The rankings of teams in each group are determined as follows:

If two or more teams are equal on the basis of the above three criteria, their rankings are determined as follows:

All times are local, COT (UTC−5).

Group A

Group B

Group C

Group D

Group E

Group F

Ranking of third-placed teams
The four best teams among those ranked third are determined as follows:
 points obtained in all group matches;
 goal difference in all group matches;
 number of goals scored in all group matches;
 drawing of lots by the FIFA Organising Committee.

Knockout stage
In the knockout stages, if a match is level at the end of normal playing time, extra time shall be played (two periods of five minutes each) and followed, if necessary, by kicks from the penalty mark to determine the winner. However, for the third place match, no extra time shall be played and the winner shall be determined by kicks from the penalty mark.

Combinations of matches in the Round of 16
The specific match-ups involving the third-placed teams depend on which four third-placed teams qualified for the round of 16:

Round of 16

Quarter-finals

Semi-finals

Third place match

Final

Champions

Awards
The following awards were given for the tournament:

Goalscorers
12 goals

 Ricardinho

10 goals

 Eder Lima
 Falcão

7 goals

 Bolinha

6 goals

 Vassoura
 Suphawut Thueanklang

5 goals

 Fineo
 Dieguinho
 Abdelrahman El-Ashwal
 Ali Asghar Hassanzadeh
 Mahdi Javid
 Fernando Cardinal
 Ivan Chishkala
 Jirawat Sornwichian

4 goals

 Cristian Borruto
 Alan Brandi
 Leandro Cuzzolino
 Alamiro Vaporaki
 Fernandinho
 Rodrigo
 Angellot Caro
 Ahmad Esmaeilpour
 Adil Habil
 Enmanuel Ayala
 Juan Salas
 Artem Niyazov
 Miguelín
 Sergio Lozano
 Kritsada Wongkaeo
 Jetsada Chudech

3 goals

 Santiago Basile
 Gallo
 Alejandro Paniagua
 Mostafa Eid
 Hossein Tayyebi
 Murilo Ferreira
 Rodolfo Fortino
 Douglas Júnior
 Pavel Taku
 Dino
 Sergei Abramovich
 Daniil Davydov
 Dmitri Lyskov
 Vladislav Shayakhmetov
 Rômulo
 Jesús Aicardo
 Nguyễn Minh Trí

2 goals

 Gregory Giovenali
 Damián Stazzone
 Pablo Taborda
 Ari
 Bateria
 Xuxa
 Jorge Abril
 Sandy Dominguez
 Alejandro Marrero
 Mizo
 Farhad Tavakoli
 Afshin Kazemi
 Luca Leggiero
 Gabriel Lima
 Leo Jaraguá
 Arnold Knaub
 Calo
 Abdiel Castrellón
 Fernando Mena
 Francisco Martínez
 Juan Pedrozo
 Richard Rejala
 René Villalba
 Tiago Brito
 André Coelho
 Djô
 Sergei Abramov
 Ivan Milovanov
 Jeffery Bule
 Elliot Ragomo
 Raúl Campos
 Denys Ovsyannikov
 Javlon Anorov
 Trần Văn Vũ

1 goal

 Jonathan Barrientos
 Adam Cooper
 Chris Zeballos
 Gerardo Battistoni
 Constantino Vaporaki
 Fernando Wilhelm
 Vitaliy Borisov
 Eduardo
 Fabio Poletto
 Rovshan Huseynli
 Jackson Samurai
 Jé
 Jhonatan Toro
 Andrés Reyes
 Juan Alonso Cordero
 Erick Brenes
 Carlos Chaves
 Edwin Cubillo
 Andy Baquero
 Karel Marino
 Daniel Hernandez
 Essam Alla
 Ahmed Homos
 Mostafa Nader
 Jonatan Arévalo
 Walter Enríquez
 José González
 José Mansilla
 Patrick Ruiz
 Wanderley Ruiz
 Mohammad Keshavarz
 Carlos dos Santos
 Marco Ercolessi
 Alex Merlim
 Sergio Romano
 Aleksandr Dovgan
 Ilya Mun
 Nikolai Pengrin
 Chingiz Yesenamanov
 Dauren Nurgozhin
 Youssef El Mazray
 Mohamed Jouad
 Magu
 Mário
 Michael De León
 Josue Brown
 Enrique Franco
 Hugo Martínez
 Juan Morel
 Miguel Ângelo
 João Matos
 Ré
 Gustavo
 Coleman Makau
 Bebe
 Fernandão
 José Ruiz
 Rivillos
 Apiwat Chaemcharoen
 Wiwat Thaijaroen
 Dmytro Bondar
 Mykhailo Grytsyna
 Mykola Grytsyna
 Sergiy Koval
 Oleksandr Sorokin
 Serhiy Zhurba
 Nodir Elibaev
 Dilshod Irsaliev

Own goals
2 goals

 Vassoura (playing against Spain)

1 goal

 Dean Lockhart (playing against Brazil)
 Ibrahim Eika (playing against Thailand)
 Sergio Romano (playing against Guatemala)
 Dauren Nurgozhin (playing against Spain)
 Ricardinho (playing against Uzbekistan)
 Fernandão (playing against Russia)
 Nattawut Madyalan (playing against Russia)
 Oleksandr Sorokin (playing against Brazil)
 Trần Long Vũ (playing against Paraguay)

Tournament ranking 
Per statistical convention in football, matches decided in extra time are counted as wins and losses, while matches decided by penalty shoot-out are counted as draws.

Broadcasting rights

Television

Radio

Notes

References

External links
FIFA Futsal World Cup Colombia 2016, FIFA.com
FIFA Technical Report

 
2016
FIFA World Cup
2016
2016 in Colombian football
September 2016 sports events in South America
October 2016 sports events in South America
Sport in Medellín
Sport in Cali